The Eight Treasures, also known as the Eight Precious Things, are popular symbols often depicted in Chinese art and on Chinese numismatic charms.

While technically they may be any subset of the much longer list of the Hundred Treasures, there is a combination that is most popular.

 The Wish-granting Pearl (寳珠/宝珠, Bǎozhū) or flaming pearl symbolises the granting of wishes.
 The Double Lozenges (方勝/方胜, "Fāngshèng") symbolises happiness in marriage and counteracts maleficent influences.
 The Stone Chime (磬, "Qìng") symbolises a just and upright life.
 The pair of Rhinoceros Horns (犀角, Xījiǎo) symbolises happiness.
 The Double Coins (雙錢/双钱, Shuāngqián) symbolises wealth.
 The gold or silver Ingot (錠/锭, Dìng)
 The Coral (珊瑚, Shānhú)
 The Wish-granting Scepter (如意, Rúyì)

See also 
 Ashtamangala, eight sacred treasures and symbols in Buddhism, Hinduism, and Jainism.
 Cintamani, a wish-fulfilling jewel in Buddhism.

References 

8 Eight Treasures
Chinese iconography
Magic items